Seydi can refer to:

Seydi, Iran, a municipality in Iran
Seýdi, a municipality in Turkmenistan
Seyitnazar Seydi, Turkmen poet